U-44 may refer to one of the following German submarines:

 , was a Type U 43 submarine launched in 1914 and that served in the First World War until sunk on 12 August 1917
 During the First World War, Germany also had these submarines with similar names:
 , a Type UB II submarine launched in 1916 and disappeared after 4 August 1916
 , a Type UC II submarine launched in 1916 and sunk on 4 August 1917
 , a Type IX submarine that served in the Second World War until sunk in March 1940

Submarines of Germany